Metatarsal artery may refer to

 Dorsal metatarsal arteries
 First dorsal metatarsal artery
 Plantar metatarsal arteries